The moa-nalo are a group of extinct aberrant, goose-like ducks that lived on the larger Hawaiian Islands, except Hawaii itself, in the Pacific. They were the major herbivores on most of these islands until they became extinct after human settlement.

Description
The moa-nalo (the name literally means "lost fowl"; the plural and the singular are the same) were unknown to science, having been wiped out before the arrival of James Cook (1778), until the early 1980s, when their subfossil remains were discovered in sand dunes on the islands of Molokai and Kauai. Subsequently, bones were found on Maui, Oahu, and Lānai, in lava tubes, lake beds, and sinkholes. They represent four species in three genera so far:

 Chelychelynechen quassus (turtle-jawed moa-nalo) from Kauai
 Ptaiochen pau (small-billed moa-nalo) from Maui
 Thambetochen xanion (O'ahu moa-nalo) from Oahu
 Thambetochen chauliodous (Maui Nui large-billed moa-nalo) from Maui, Lānai and Molokai (Maui Nui)

Chelychelynechen, meaning turtle-jawed goose, had a large, heavy bill like that of a tortoise, while the other two genera, Thambetochen and Ptaiochen, all had serrations in their bills known as pseudoteeth, similar to those of mergansers.

Evolution

Some moa-nalo fossils have been found to contain traces of mitochondrial DNA which were compared to living duck species in order to establish their place in the duck family, Anatidae. Contrary to the expectations of some scientists, the moa-nalo were not related to the large geese (Anserinae), such as the surviving nēnē, but instead to the dabbling ducks of the genus Anas, which includes the mallard. The present DNA analysis' resolution is not high enough to determine their relationships to different species of Anas, but biogeography strongly suggests that their closest living relative is the widespread Pacific black duck.

Ecology

The unusual shape and size of the moa-nalo can be attributed to their role in the ecology of prehistoric Hawaii. A study of coprolites (fossil dung) of Thambetochen chauliodous found in Puu Naio Cave on lowland Maui has shown they were folivorous, at least in dry shrub or mesic forest habitats eating particularly fronds from ferns (possibly Asplenium nidus or Dryopteris wallichiana). This conclusion is backed up by the shapes of their beaks (James & Burney 1997). This indicates they were the principal browsers on the island.
The presence of prominent spines on the leaves and soft young stems of several Hawaiian lobelioids in the genus Cyanea—unusual in an island flora where such defenses are frequently lost, as in the ākala (Hawaiian raspberry)—suggests that the Cyanea evolved these thorn-like prickles on new growth because they protect against browsing by the moa-nalo. The moa-nalo themselves filled the niche of herbivore usually filled by mammals such as goats and deer, or the giant tortoises of Galápagos and other archipelagoes. This has implications for the ecology of Hawaiian Islands today, as a major group of species have been lost.

Like island taxa from Mauritius, New Zealand and Polynesia, the moa-nalo were unused to mammals and were easily taken by hunters or the animals that were introduced and became feral, such as domestic pigs.

See also
 Giant tortoises, found on several archipelagos around the world
 Island gigantism
 Late Quaternary prehistoric birds
 Moa, enormous extinct flightless ratites, formerly the largest herbivores in New Zealand

References

 James, Helen F. & Burney, David A. (1997): The diet and ecology of Hawaii's extinct flightless waterfowl: evidence from coprolites. Biol. J. Linn. Soc. 62(2): 279–297. HTML abstract

Further reading
 . Chapter 1 of the book is about the moa-nalo, and avian paleontologists working in Hawaii.
 Slikas, Beth (2003): Hawaiian Birds: Lessons from a Rediscovered Avifauna. Auk 120(4): 953–960. DOI: 10.1642/0004-8038(2003)120[0953:HBLFAR]2.0.CO;2* Sorenson et al. (1999): Relationships of the extinct moa-nalos, flightless Hawaiian waterfowl, based on ancient DNA. Proceedings of the Royal Society.

Anatinae
Holocene extinctions
Extinct flightless birds
Extinct birds of Hawaii
Late Quaternary prehistoric birds
Endemic fauna of Hawaii